San Marino participated in the Junior Eurovision Song Contest 2015 in Sofia, Bulgaria. On 27 September 2015 it was confirmed that they would participate in the 2015 contest. The country used an internal selection to select the artist and the song. Kamilla Ismailova represented San Marino with the song "Mirror".

Internal selection
On 29 October 2015, San Marino chose their artist for the contest through an internal selection. Kamilla Ismailova was selected to represent the country, despite being born and raised in Russia.

Artist and song information

Kamilla Ismailova
Kamilla Ismailova was born in Russia on July 22, 2004. She is half-Azerbaijani. She represented San Marino in Junior Eurovision 2015. Kamilla visited San Marino in her early childhood, and since then this small country has taken a place in her heart. The language, the feeling, the people and their pace of life, and the traditions of the country all made a big impression on Kamilla, who promised herself that someday she would be connected with the country again.

Aside from Junior Eurovision, Kamilla and her friends from the "S. T. A. R. S" Academy of cinema and show-business host a music chart called "Kids' Top 10 with Yana Rudkovskaya", and also present a fashion/music program called "TrYnd-Fashion". She is also a lover of horses, and enjoys racing with them.

Kamilla made an appearance in the official video of "A Million Voices" by Polina Gagarina, whom represented Russia in Eurovision Song Contest 2015.

Mirror
"Mirror" is a song by Russian-Azerbaijani child singer Kamilla Ismailova. It represented San Marino at the Junior Eurovision Song Contest 2015 in Bulgaria, ending 14th out of 17 songs with 36 points.

At Junior Eurovision

At the running order draw which took place on 15 November 2015, San Marino were drawn to perform fourteenth on 21 November 2015, following host country  and preceding .

Final
San Marino's representative was wearing a very long white dress full of mirrors and she was joined on stage by 4 dancers dressed in silver, also with mirrors. The background was dark, full of stars and reflections and the lighting was white and very dynamic. Wearing iridescent makeup and a dress partially encrusted in mirrors, Kamilla and her crew literally shine when the spotlights move around them. The camerawork allowed for plenty of views of Kamilla's talented backing dancers.

Voting
The voting during the final consisted of 50 percent public televoting and 50 percent from a jury deliberation. The jury consisted of five music industry professionals who were citizens of the country they represent, with their names published before the contest to ensure transparency. This jury was asked to judge each contestant based on: vocal capacity; the stage performance; the song's composition and originality; and the overall impression by the act. In addition, no member of a national jury could be related in any way to any of the competing acts in such a way that they cannot vote impartially and independently. The individual rankings of each jury member were released one month after the final.

Following the release of the full split voting by the EBU after the conclusion of the competition, it was revealed that San Marino had placed ninth with the public televote and fifteenth with the jury vote. In the public vote, San Marino scored 51 points, while with the jury vote, San Marino scored 15 points.

Below is a breakdown of points awarded to San Marino and awarded by San Marino in the final and the breakdown of the jury voting and televoting conducted during the final.

Detailed voting results
The Sammarinese votes in this final were based on 100% jury. The following members comprised the Sammarinese jury:
 Viola Conti
 Nicola Della Valle
 Barbara Andreini
 Francesco Stefanelli
 Matteo Venturini

Notes

References

Junior Eurovision Song Contest
San Marino
Junior